Kaivantha Kalai is a 2006 Tamil-language comedy drama film written and directed by Pandiarajan. The film stars his son Prithvirajan, whereas Sruthi, Manivannan, and the director himself play other important roles. The film released on 15 June 2006 to positive reviews.

Plot
Kannan (Prithvirajan) is in league with his father (Manivannan) in duping the people in his village. He comes across Kausalya (Sruthi), a timid, schoolgoing Brahmin girl and falls for her immediately. From his grandfather, he learns that Kausalya's mom is his father's sister and becomes even more determined to wed her. Kausalya begins to like him too but asks him to mend his ways before they can get married.

Cast

 Prithvi as Kannan
 Sruthi as Kausalya
 Pandiarajan as Ganesan
 Manivannan as Kannan's father
 Seetha as sub inspector 
 Revathi
 Rohini
 Pandiyan
 Vinu Chakravarthy
 Janagaraj
 Vennira Aadai Moorthy
 G. Gnanasambandam
 Pandu
 King Kong as Office Assistant
 Nellai Siva
 Bava Lakshmanan
 Suruli Manohar
 Chelladurai
 Bonda Mani
 Kovai Senthil
 Balu Anand
 Benjamin
 Malavika in a guest appearance

Soundtrack
Music is composed by Dhina.

Release 
Malini Mannath of Chennai Online opined that "With scenes and situations a little different from the routine ones, 'Kai Vantha Kalai' is a fairly engaging and a neatly packaged wholesome family entertainer". On the contrary, S. Sudha of Rediff.com wrote that "In short, far from a comeback or launch pad, this is just a big bore".

References

2006 films
2000s Tamil-language films